Leung Ming-kai is a Hong Kong cinematographer and film director. He is most noted for the films Old Stone, for which he was a Canadian Screen Award nominee for Best Cinematography at the 5th Canadian Screen Awards in 2017, and Memories to Choke On, Drinks to Wash Them Down, for which he and Kate Reilly won the award for Best Screenplay at the 2020 Hong Kong Film Critics Society Awards.

His other film credits have included What Isn't There, Mundane History, Mutual Friends, Ek Hazarachi Note, Murmur of the Hearts, Suk Suk, Drifting, Far Far Away and The Sunny Side of the Street.

He is married to Reilly, an American actress and producer.

References

External links

Hong Kong film directors
Hong Kong cinematographers
Hong Kong screenwriters
Living people
Year of birth missing (living people)